There have been two baronetcies created for members of the McMahon family, both in the Baronetage of the United Kingdom, and belonging to different branches of the same family. One creation is extant as of 2007.

The McMahon Baronetcy, of Dublin, was created in the Baronetage of the United Kingdom on 6 May 1815 for William MacMahon, who was Master of the Rolls in Ireland. The title became extinct on the death of the fourth Baronet in 1926.

The McMahon Baronetcy, of Ashley Manor, was created in the Baronetage of the United Kingdom on 7 August 1817 for John McMahon, Member of Parliament for Aldeburgh from 1802 to 1812 and Private Secretary to George IV from 1811 to 1817. He was the brother of the first baronet of the 1815 creation. McMahon was succeeded according to a special remainder by his second brother, the second baronet. He was a general in the army and served as commander-in-chief of the forces at Bombay.

The family surname is pronounced "Mac Ma-hon".

McMahon baronets, of Dublin (1815)

Sir William MacMahon, 1st Baronet (1776–1837) 
Sir Beresford Burston McMahon, 2nd Baronet (1808–1873) 
Sir William Samuel McMahon, 3rd Baronet (1839–1905) 
Sir Lionel McMahon, 4th Baronet (1856–1926)

McMahon baronets, of Ashley Manor (1817)
Sir John McMahon, 1st Baronet (died 1817) 
Sir Thomas McMahon, 2nd Baronet (1779–1860) 
Sir Thomas Westropp McMahon, 3rd Baronet (1814–1892) 
Sir Aubrey Hope McMahon, 4th Baronet (1862–1893) 
Sir Horace Westropp McMahon, 5th Baronet (1863–1932) 
Lt.-Col. Sir Eyre McMahon, OBE, 6th Baronet (1860–1935) 
Sir (William) Patrick McMahon, 7th Baronet (1900–1977) 
Sir Brian Patrick McMahon, 8th Baronet (1942–2018)
Sir Patrick John Westropp McMahon, 9th Baronet (born 1988)

References

Kidd, Charles, Williamson, David (editors). Debrett's Peerage and Baronetage (1990 edition). New York: St Martin's Press, 1990.

Baronetcies in the Baronetage of the United Kingdom
Baronetcies created with special remainders
Extinct baronetcies in the Baronetage of the United Kingdom